Air Chief Marshal Sir Patrick Bardon Hine,  (born 14 July 1932) is a former senior Royal Air Force commander. Most notably, he was joint commander of all British forces during the Gulf War.

RAF career
Hine was born near Southampton on 14 July 1932. He was educated at Peter Symonds School in Winchester.  He entered the RAF on a National Service commission as an acting pilot officer on probation on 22 March 1951, and was regraded as a pilot officer on 6 February 1952. He was commissioned as a pilot officer on 14 October 1952 (seniority from 6 February 1952), and promoted to flying officer on 20 March 1953. He was appointed to a permanent commission in the RAF on 1 October 1953, in the rank of flying officer.

As a junior officer, Hine flew the Gloster Meteor and then the Hawker Hunter. He was promoted to flight lieutenant on 20 September 1956.  From 1957 to 1959 he performed on the Black Arrows, then the RAF's aerobatics display team. He was awarded the Queen's Commendation for Valuable Service in the Air in the 1960 Birthday Honours List. He was promoted to squadron leader on 1 July 1962 and appointed Officer Commanding No. 92 Squadron. On 1 January 1968, he was promoted to wing commander, and was promoted to group captain on 1 January 1972.

On 1 July 1975, he was promoted to air commodore and was appointed Director of Public Relations for the RAF. He was made Senior Air Staff Officer at HQ RAF Germany in 1979. He was promoted to air vice-marshal on 1 January 1980 and was appointed Assistant Chief of the Air Staff (Policy) at the Ministry of Defence the next year. He became Commander of the Second Tactical Air Force and Commander-in-Chief of RAF Germany in 1983. Promoted to acting air marshal by June 1983, he was knighted with a Knight Commander of the Order of the Bath in the 1983 Birthday Honours List.

Promoted to air chief marshal on 1 July 1985, he became Vice-Chief of the Defence Staff that year. In late 1987 he was appointed Air Member for Supply and Organisation.

Hine was appointed Air Officer Commanding-in-Chief Strike Command in 1988. He was promoted to a Knight Grand Cross of the Order of the Bath in the 1989 New Year Honours List.

He was Joint Commander of all British forces during the Gulf War. He was appointed a Knight Grand Cross of the Order of the British Empire in the 1991 Birthday Honours List.

Hine retired from the RAF in 1991 and subsequently became a military advisor to British Aerospace from which he retired in April 1999. Two years earlier, in 1997, Hine was made the King of Arms of the Order of the British Empire, making him the herald to the Order of the British Empire.

He became a member of The Royal and Ancient Golf Club of St Andrews in 1995 and in May 2010 he was nominated to be the Captain of the Royal and Ancient for the year 2010–11. His home course is Brokenhurst Manor Golf Club in Hampshire, where he is the Club President. Hine also had a prolific amateur golfing career and won the Carris Trophy (England U18 Stroke Play Championship) and the Brabazon Trophy (England Amateur Stoke Play Champion) in 1949. He also won the Hampshire County Championship in that year. He represented England in the England–Scotland boys match in 1948 and 1949.

Family
Hine and his wife, Jill, have three sons.

References

|-
 

|-
 

|-

|-

|-

1932 births
Living people
Knights Grand Cross of the Order of the Bath
Knights Grand Cross of the Order of the British Empire
Recipients of the Commendation for Valuable Service in the Air
Royal Air Force air marshals
Royal Air Force personnel of the Falklands War
Royal Air Force air marshals of the Gulf War
English male golfers
Amateur golfers
Military personnel from Southampton